Filth Hounds of Hades is the debut studio album by British heavy metal band Tank, released in March 1982 on the Kamaflage label.

The album was produced by "Fast" Eddie Clarke of Motörhead, and recorded between December 1981 and January 1982 at Ramport Studios in London. The Canadian pressing on Attic Records had an alternate blue cover with the dogs in maroon and with a different logo.

The title came from Viv Stanshall's Sir Henry at Rawlinson End, originally a radio series recorded for the John Peel show in 1975, and later a 1978 album and 1980 film:

"Filth hounds of Hades!: Sir Henry Rawlinson surfaced from the blackness, hot and fidgety, fuss, bother and itch, conscious mind coming up too fast for the bends, through pack-ice thrubbing seas, boom-sounders, blow-holes, harsh-croak Blind Pews tip-tap-tocking for escape from his pressing skull...."

In an interview with Sounds, drummer Mark Brabbs said that "It came from Viv Stanshall's book and it just sounded apt 'cos we all like his humour. It just seemed to describe the sort of people who came to see us when we first started they were the same as us, just having a party, starting drinking each day at lunchtime, so it seemed apt, 'cos we called them The Filth even then, though not in a derogatory way!"

Track listing 
All songs by Tank (Mark Brabbs, Peter Brabbs and Algy Ward).
Side one
 "Shellshock" – 3:10
 "Struck by Lightning" – 3:10
 "Run Like Hell" – 3:40
 "Blood, Guts, and Beer" – 3:42
 "That What Dreams Are Made Of" – 5:32

Side two
"Turn Your Head Around" – 3:25
 "Heavy Artillery" – 3:28
 "Who Needs Love Songs" – 3:06
 "Filth Hounds of Hades" – 3:56
 "(He Fell in Love with a) Stormtrooper" – 5:17

Initial copies of the album came with a free 7":
 "Don't Walk Away" (live)
 "The Snake"

Personnel 
Tank
Algy Ward – vocals, bass
Peter Brabbs – guitar
Mark Brabbs – drums

Production
"Fast" Eddie Clarke – producer
Will Reid Dick – engineer
Neil Hornby – tape operator

References 

1982 debut albums
Tank (band) albums